Frame 394 is a Canadian documentary film, directed by Rich Williamson and released in 2016.

Summary
The film centres on Daniel Voshart, a Canadian cinematographer and image stabilization specialist who reviewed the video of the shooting of Walter Scott, and claimed to have discovered evidence in frame 394 of the video "that challenged the accepted narrative of what transpired between Slager and Scott". The frame appears to show Scott's hands on Slager's taser at the time the officer reached for his gun. If true, this could create justification for use of force. The film discusses the moral conflict caused by the discovery, as the original intent was to find evidence that could be used to convict, not acquit the officer.

Accolades
The film premiered at the 2016 Hot Docs Canadian International Documentary Festival.

The film was named to the Toronto International Film Festival's annual year-end Canada's Top Ten list for 2016, and was a Canadian Screen Award nominee for Best Short Documentary Film at the 5th Canadian Screen Awards. It was also named to the initial shortlist for the Academy Award for Best Documentary (Short Subject), but was not one of the final five nominees at the 89th Academy Awards.

References

External links
 Frame 394 at the Canadian Broadcasting Corporation
 

2016 films
2016 short documentary films
Canadian short documentary films
2010s English-language films
2010s Canadian films